

National radio stations 
Broadcaster is Rozhlas a televízia Slovenska, owned by Government of Slovakia.

Multiregional commercial radio stations

Multiregional christian radio stations

Regional radio stations

Local radio stations

Internet radio stations (selected)

See also 
 Rozhlas a televízia Slovenska

 
Slovakia